William Drake may refer to:

Arts and entertainment
William Henry Drake (painter) (1886–1926), American painter and illustrator
William A. Drake (1899–1965), American screenwriter
Bill Drake (1937–2008), American radio programmer
William D. Drake (born 1962), British musician

Politics and law
Sir William Drake, 1st Baronet (1606–1669), English lawyer and Member of Parliament
Sir William Drake (died 1690) (c. 1651–1690), English Member of Parliament for Amersham, 1669–1690
Sir William Drake, 4th Baronet (1658–1716), English Member of Parliament
William Drake (1723–1796) (senior), English Member of Parliament for Amersham, 1746–1796
William Drake (1747–1795) (junior), English Member of Parliament for Amersham, 1768

Other
William Drake (antiquary) (1723–1801), Church of England priest, antiquary and philologist
William Henry Drake (1812–1882), British public servant and colonial treasurer of Western Australia
Bill Drake (baseball) (1895–1977), American Negro league baseball player
Billy Drake (1917–2011), British RAF pilot
Bill Drake (rugby league) (1931–2012), English rugby league footballer
William Drake (organ builder) (1943–2014), British organ builder

See also
William Tyrwhitt-Drake (1785–1848), Tory English Member of Parliament for Amersham from 1810
William Drake Westervelt (1849–1939), writer on Hawaiian history and legends

Drake, William